Georg Ludwig Alexander von Wahlen-Jürgass (1758–1833) was a Prussian cavalry officer during the Napoleonic Wars.

Notes

Further reading

1758 births
1833 deaths
Prussian Army personnel of the Napoleonic Wars
German military personnel of the Napoleonic Wars